Oak Grove Union School District has around 800 students and serves western Santa Rosa, California and eastern Sebastopol, California. The district has one elementary school and one middle school. Oak Grove School, a TK-5 grade school, is nestled in the hills above the little town of Graton. Willowside Middle School, a 6-8 grade middle school, is located just west of Santa Rosa, among vineyards and rural environments. Both schools boast small populations with a private school-like atmosphere.  The superintendent of the district is Amber Stringfellow.

Oak Grove school was founded in 1854 making Oak Grove Union School District the second-oldest school district in California.

Elementary school
Oak Grove Elementary

Middle school
Willowside Middle School

External links

See also
 List of school districts in Sonoma County, California

Education in Santa Rosa, California
School districts in Sonoma County, California
1854 establishments in California
School districts established in 1854